Emily J. Yoffe (born October 15, 1955) is an American journalist and contributing writer for The Atlantic.  From 1998 to 2016 she was a regular contributor to Slate magazine, notably as Dear Prudence. She has also written for The New York Times; O, The Oprah Magazine; The Washington Post; Esquire; the Los Angeles Times; Texas Monthly; and many other publications. Yoffe began her career as a staff writer at The New Republic before moving on to other publications.

Career 
In 2006 outgoing columnist Margo Howard turned Slates "Dear Prudence" advice column over to Yoffe. The column appears four times per week, including one day of live chats and one day in which the letters are responded to using a video instead of text. In November 2015, Yoffe published her last "Dear Prudence" column, and was replaced by Daniel M. Lavery, co-founder of The Toast.  Lavery left Dear Prudence in 2021.

Yoffe also hosted a podcast called "Manners for the Digital Age" with Slates then-technology columnist Farhad Manjoo.

She wrote a regular feature on Slate called "Human Guinea Pig", in which she attempted unusual activities or hobbies. For "Human Guinea Pig", she has tried hypnosis, and taken a vow of silence. She has become a street performer, a nude model for an art class, and a contestant in the Mrs. America beauty pageant.

In June 2005, Bloomsbury published Yoffe's What the Dog Did: Tales from a Formerly Reluctant Dog Owner.  That year it was named Best Book of the Year by Dogwise, and selected as the Best General Interest Dog Book by the Dog Writers Association of America.

She was a guest on The Colbert Report twice. She discussed her experiences as Slate's "Human Guinea Pig", and an article about narcissistic personality disorder. She has been a guest on numerous radio programs, including The Emily Rooney Show and Minnesota Public Radio.

Yoffe has written pieces about the worldwide disappearance of frogs and the crash of Air Florida Flight 90 for The New York Times Magazine. She has written op-eds for The Washington Post on global warming, motherhood, and politics.

As of December 2022, she is a writer for The Free Press.

Campus sexual assault and #MeToo 
Yoffe has written extensively about campus sexual assault and the Obama administration's effort to end it, describing the administration's reforms of Title IX – the United States federal law prohibiting sex discrimination in federally-funded education programs – as a worthy goal that went awry.  Her article in Slate, "The College Rape Overcorrection" was a National Magazine Award finalist in Public Service in 2015.  She wrote a series on campus sexual assault for The Atlantic on due process, junk science, and racial disparities. The series was a nominee for Top Ten Works of Journalism of the Decade by New York University's Arthur L. Carter Journalism Institute.

She has praised #MeToo, but expressed concerns about overreach.  She wrote about "The Problem With #BelieveSurvivors",  the consequences of Al Franken's resignation from the Senate, and the dangers of "endlessly expand[ing] the categories of victim and perpetrator."

She is a signer of A Letter on Justice and Open Debate published in Harper's Magazine. She is a member of the board of advisors of Persuasion.community, an organization that defends the ideals of a free society. For them she wrote, "A Taxonomy of Fear," which describes the methods of cancel culture and why it must be opposed.

Education 
Yoffe grew up in Newton, Massachusetts and graduated from Wellesley College in 1977.

Books
 What the Dog Did: Tales from a Formerly Reluctant Dog Owner (2005)

Awards
 Dogwise: Best Book of the Year (2005)
 Dog Writers Association of America: Best General Interest Dog Book (2005)

References

External links
 Emily Yoffe on Twitter
 Writings by Emily Yoffe at Slate
 Writings by Emily Yoffe at The Atlantic
 What the Dog Did book website at the Wayback Machine

American advice columnists
American women columnists
Living people
Slate (magazine) people
1955 births
The New Republic people
Wellesley College alumni
Writers from Newton, Massachusetts
Journalists from Massachusetts
20th-century American journalists
21st-century American journalists
American women journalists
20th-century American women writers
21st-century American women writers